, better known as , is a Japanese director, television producer, critic, and writer. His name "Terry" comes from his first name, "Teruo". His ancestral home is in Yokoshibahikari, Sanbu District, Chiba Prefecture.

Ito served as the president of the television program production company, Locomotion.

Ito, in conjunction with Toyota, helped design a limited edition pink S210 Toyota Crown called Toyota Reborn Pink Crown Athlete. The Crown featured a bright pink exterior and pink trim pieces in the interior. Toyota sold 650 units of the limited vehicle.

Filmography

TV series

Past

Drama

Films

Advertisements

Mobile websites

Video games

References

External links
Locomotion Co. Ltd 
Profile 

Japanese directors
Japanese television producers
Japanese critics
Japanese writers
1949 births
Living people
People from Chūō, Tokyo